Francis Marsh (23 October 1626 – 16 November 1693) was Archbishop of Dublin from 1682 to 1693.

He had previously been Dean of Connor (1660–1661), Dean of Armagh (1661–1667), Bishop of Limerick, Ardfert and Aghadoe and Kilmore and Ardagh. He married Mary, the daughter of Bishop Jeremy Taylor. Their son, Dr. Jeremy Marsh (1667 – 3 June 1734) was the Dean of Kilmore.

From his father-in-law, Jeremy Taylor, he inherited a silver watch, said to have been a gift from Charles I. This watch remained in the family of his great-grandson, Francis Marsh, barrister-at-law.

References

Deans of Connor
Deans of Armagh
Bishops of Limerick, Ardfert and Aghadoe
Bishops of Kilmore and Ardagh
Anglican archbishops of Dublin
1693 deaths
1626 births
Members of the Privy Council of Ireland